Bienvenido "Benny" Mirando Abante Jr. (born May 15, 1951) is a Filipino politician and Bible Baptist pastor who is currently serving as the representative of Manila's 6th district since 2019, a position he previously held from 2004 to 2010. He also served as a House Deputy Speaker from 2020 to 2022, House Minority Leader from 2019 to 2020, and a councilor of Manila from the 6th district from 1992 to 1995. He is also the host pastor of the Metropolitan Bible Baptist Church and Ministries in Santa Ana, Manila.

Early life and education
Abante was born in Santa Mesa, Manila on July 15, 1951, the eldest of four sons of the Rev. Ben O. Abante Sr. and Priscilla Mirando. He has two younger brothers, who both grew up to be ministers.

He grew up taking on odd jobs such as shining shoes, selling newspapers and corsages and working on a construction site at a young age to support himself. He also worked as an auditor. He earned his bachelor's degree from Far Eastern University in 1971. He later graduated with a bachelor's and graduate degrees in theology at Citadel Baptist College in Sacramento, California and Baptist Bible College in Makati, respectively. He also holds a master's degree in Government Management from the Pamantasan ng Lungsod ng Maynila.

Ministerial career 
In 1975, he started the Metropolitan Bible Baptist Church and Ministries in Santa Ana, Manila. He is also in the academe, having been named as the president of Metropolitan Lighthouse Theological School and Institute in Quezon City and administrator of the Metropolitan International Christian Academy in Manila in 1985. He was conferred a honorary degree in theology at Citadel Baptist College in 1985 and honorary doctor of theology at Indianapolis Baptist College in 1987.

In 1986, he founded the Bible Believers League for Morality and Democracy (BIBLEMODE), and also heads the Abante International Ministries (AIM), the Grace and Truth Community International Foundation, Inc., and the Ben O. Abante Baptist Bible College.

Political career
He served as a councilor of Manila from the 6th district from 1992 to 1995. He was recognized by the Manila City Hall Press Club as the Outstanding Councilor of Manila in 1994. After his term as councilor, he served as commissioner of Presidential Commission for Urban Poor, Manila from 1996 to 1998. He was also named special assistant to national chairman of Lakas–NUCD in 2000.

House of Representatives 
He ran and won a seat in the House of Representatives in May 2004. He was subsequently named chairman of the Committee on Public Information. His major undertakings in his district focused on health, education, social services and infrastructure development and/or improvement. Abante's committee also scrutinized the Right of Reply Bill that was criticized by the media organizations as a curtailment to the freedom of the press. He also proposed an Anti-Sex Video Bill that imposes stiffer penalties of the people involved in the manufacture of sex videos. He was one of the principal authors of the Freedom of Information (FOI) Bill during the 14th Congress. The FOI bill was defeated in Congress after its opponents questioned if there was a quorum on the final session day. Abante unsuccessfully defended his seat in the 2010 election, losing to former representative Rosenda Ann "Sandy" Ocampo. He attempted a comeback to the Congress in 2013 and 2016 but was unsuccessful, losing both to Ocampo. Abante was elected as Representative of Manila's 6th District in 2019 with the previous incumbent Ocampo ineligible for reelection. He ran against Councilor Cassy Sison and newcomer Yvette Ocampo, Sandy's sister. He ran under the banner of Asenso Manileño with Isko Moreno running for Mayor.

On July 10, 2020, he is one of the 11 representatives who voted to grant the franchise renewal of ABS-CBN. He is one of the two Manila Lawmakers to grant the franchise along with Edward Maceda. He was re-elected in 2022.

Positions

LGBT issues
Abante has made some legislative proposals that affects the LGBT community. In 2010, he filed a bill that proposed the criminalization of conducting same sex unions, which he views "highly immoral, scandalous and detestable", which aims to penalize couples and the solemnizing officer by fine an imprisonment.

He has also filed a bill to institutionalize the rights of heterosexual people including guaranteeing them being able to express opinions about LGBT issues according "to their religious beliefs and practices and to biblical principles and standards." Since there were efforts to introduce bills to protect the rights of LGBT people, Abante argued that in the spirit of "justice, equity, and fair play", a bill on heterosexuals, who he says are "actual and direct creations of God" is apt. He also believes that LGBT people who face discrimination ought to "to be what God created us to be".

Abante has opposed the passage of a legislation guaranteeing rights of members of the LGBT community, believing that such measure would eventually lead to the legalization of same sex unions. He believes that LGBT rights is more of a "moral issue" rather than a "rights issue". He opposed the SOGIE Equality Bill, saying the constitution grants already sufficient rights.

Despite his stances, Abante says he does not discriminate against the LGBT community, noting that he had supporters who are LGBT.

Pornography
Abante has aimed to legislate a measure banning pornography. His House Bill No. 3305 was passed by the House of Representatives in 2008, which would prohibit the production of pornographic videos regardless if the subjects are adults or children; consensual or non-consensual.

Personal life
Abante married Marie Paz Toledo in 1977, and has three children. His daughter Priscilla Marie is a lawyer and had served as a councilor of Manila from the 6th district from 2013 to 2022. His son Benny Fog III is an incumbent councilor from the same district since 2022.

References

1951 births
Living people
Members of the House of Representatives of the Philippines from Manila
Filipino Baptists
People from Sampaloc, Manila
People from Manila
Lakas–CMD (1991) politicians
Lakas–CMD politicians
United Nationalist Alliance politicians
National Unity Party (Philippines) politicians
Far Eastern University alumni
Pamantasan ng Lungsod ng Maynila alumni
Manila City Council members
Metro Manila city and municipal councilors
Minority leaders of the House of Representatives of the Philippines